The 2018 Atlantic Coast Conference baseball tournament was held from May 22 through 27 at Durham Bulls Athletic Park in Durham, North Carolina.  The annual tournament determines the conference champion of the Division I Atlantic Coast Conference for college baseball.  The tournament champion receives the league's automatic bid to the 2018 NCAA Division I baseball tournament.  This was the last of 19 athletic championship events held by the conference in the 2017–18 academic year.

The tournament has been held every year but one since 1973, with Clemson winning ten championships, the most all-time.  Georgia Tech has won nine championships, and Florida State has won seven titles since their entry to the league in 1992.  Charter league member Duke, along with recent entrants Virginia Tech, Boston College, Pittsburgh and Notre Dame have never won the event.  Louisville plays their third season in the ACC in 2017, and has also yet to win a title.

Florida State defeated Louisville in the championship game to win the tournament for the eighth time overall, and the third time in four seasons.

Format and seeding
The winner of each seven team division and the top ten other teams based on conference winning percentage, regardless of division, from the conference's regular season will be seeded one through twelve.  Seeds one and two are awarded to the two division winners.  Teams are then divided into four pools of three teams each, with the winners advancing to single elimination bracket for the championship.

Schedule and results

Schedule

Pool Play

Pool A

Pool B

Pool C

Pool D

Final

Championship Game

References

Tournament
Atlantic Coast Conference baseball tournament
Atlantic Coast Conference baseball tournament
Atlantic Coast Conference baseball tournament
Baseball competitions in Durham, North Carolina
College baseball tournaments in North Carolina